Grassy Creek may refer to:

The Bahamas
 Little Grassy Creek

Canada
 Rural Municipality of Grassy Creek No. 78, Saskatchewan

United States
Populated places
 Grassy Creek, Kentucky, Morgan County
 Grassy Creek, Ashe County, North Carolina
Grassy Creek Township, Ashe County, North Carolina

Streams
Grassy Creek (Salt River), a stream in Missouri
Grassy Creek (Deep River tributary), a stream in Moore County, North Carolina
Grassy Creek (Rocky River tributary), a stream in Union County, North Carolina
Grassy Creek (Elkin Creek tributary), a stream in Wilkes and Surry counties, North Carolina
Grassy Creek (Texas), a stream in Johnson County, Texas
Grassy Creek (Dan River tributary), a stream in Halifax County, Virginia

See also
 Grassy Lake (disambiguation)